The 1956 season was the Hawthorn Football Club's 32nd season in the Victorian Football League and 55th overall.

Fixture

Night Series Cup

The night series cup was a knockout tournament contested by the teams who didn't qualify for the finals.

Premiership Season

Ladder

References

Hawthorn Football Club seasons